The 2021 Lithuanian Football Cup was a single elimination association football tournament which began on 22 May 2021 and ended on 23 October 2021. The winner of the competition earned a spot in the second qualifying round of the 2022–23 UEFA Europa Conference League.

Teams from A lyga, LFF I lyga and LFF II lyga participated in the tournament this year. Same as last year, lower league teams were not invited in order to shorten the competition due to the ongoing COVID-19 pandemic. The "B" teams do not participate in the cup competition. The A lyga teams entered the tournament from the first round this year.

FK Panevėžys were the defending champions after winning the final in the previous season against FK Sūduva on penalties.

First round 
Fourteen first round matches were played on 22–25 May 2021. Two random teams received a "bye" to the second round.

|}

Second round 
Eight second round matches were played on 15–23 June 2021.

|}

Quarter–finals 
The quarter–final matches were played from 18 August to 22 September 2021.

|}

Semi–finals 
The semi–final matches were played on 28–29 September 2021.

|}

Final

See also
 2021 A Lyga

References

External links
 Lietuvos Futbolas
 Lithuanian Football Federation

Lithuanian Football Cup seasons
2021 in Lithuanian football
Seasons in Lithuanian football
Lithuania
Lithuania